Akkarai Kodiveri is a panchayat village in Gobichettipalayam taluk in Erode District of Tamil Nadu state, India. It is about 15 km from Gobichettipalayam and 50 km from district headquarters Erode.The village is located on the road connecting Gobichettipalayam with Sathyamangalam. Akkarai Kodiveri has a population of about 2263.

References

Villages in Erode district